Melaleuca clavifolia is a plant in the myrtle family, Myrtaceae and is endemic to the south-west of Western Australia. It is a small shrub similar to Melaleuca tinkeri, with "pom-pom" heads of pinkish flowers and soft, silky hairs on the new growth but it has larger flower heads and its leaves are shorter, more club-shaped and have less distinct oil glands.

Description
Its young growth is covered with soft, silky hairs some of which persist in the mature leaves and branches.

The flowers are a shade of pink to purple and are arranged in heads or short spikes on the ends of branches which continue to grow after flowering, sometimes also in the upper leaf axils. The stamens are arranged in bundles of five around the flower, with 5 to 7 stamens in each bundle.

Taxonomy and naming
Melaleuca clavifolia was first formally described in 1999 by Lyndley Craven and Brendan Lepschi in Australian Systematic Botany. The specific epithet (clavifolia) is from the Latin clava meaning "club" and folium "leaf", in reference to the shape of most of the leaves of this species.

Distribution and habitat
This melaleuca occurs in and between the Coorow, Green Head and Moore River districts in the Geraldton Sandplains and Swan Coastal Plain biogeographic regions. It grows in sand and gravel in lateritic soils on flats and hillsides.

Conservation status
Melaleuca clavifolia is listed as "not threatened" by the Government of Western Australia Department of Parks and Wildlife.

References

clavifolia
Myrtales of Australia
Plants described in 1999
Endemic flora of Western Australia
Taxa named by Lyndley Craven